is a mountain of the Mamores range in the Scottish Highlands. It is directly south of Ben Nevis, on the other side of Glen Nevis. With a height of 1099 metres (3605 feet), Sgùrr a' Mhàim is a Munro and the second-highest peak in the Mamores. Its cap of quartzite stones give it a light grey appearance which can be mistaken for a covering of snow.

Landscape 
Sgùrr a' Mhàim is the first or last peak of the 'Ring of Steall', a ridge walk taking in the other Munros of An Gearanach, Stob Coire a' Chàirn and Am Bodach. It is linked to the main spine of the Mamore group on its southern side by a feature called The Devil's Ridge, which is a one-kilometre undulating ridge with a few exposed sections which require care. The most difficult part is a rock gap known as 'The Bad Step' with Scottish hill walker Hamish Brown commenting, "The ‘Bad Step’ on the ridge is perhaps exaggerated - it can be jumped across. If you missed of course, a couple of bounces would land you down in the corries".

The Devil's Ridge has its own peak at the midpoint called Stob Choire a' Mhàil (990 metres high). At the southern end of the ridge is Sgùrr an Iubhair ('peak of the yew'), a 1001 m peak that briefly gained Munro status in 1981 only to lose it again in 1997. When viewed from the ridge, Sgùrr an Iubhair appears to be a separate mountain, but both the above peaks are listed as "tops" of Sgùrr a' Mhàim in the Munro Tables. Sgùrr a' Mhàim's northern side contrasts to its southern flank (where the Devil's Ridge is). The northern slopes drop steeply to Glen Nevis, and there are two corries which end abruptly in cliffs which fall steeply into the Nevis gorge.

Climbing 
From the northern flank, the mountain can be ascended directly using one of the three ridges that descend to the glen. The most popular of these is up the north west ridge from Achriabhach where there is a carpark but it is also possible to ascend from upper Glen Nevis via the north east or east ridges which spring from the Allt Coire a' Mhàil above the An Steall Ban waterfall. Both these routes require some scrambling. A more circuitous ascent goes up to the head of Coire a' Mhusgain from Achriabhach to cross the ridge to the summit.  The summit cairn is substantial being made up of light coloured quartzite stones and gives a view of the southern side of Ben Nevis, and also an aerial view down into Glen Nevis.

References 
 The Munros (SMC Guide), Donald Bennett et al., 
 100 Best Routes on Scottish Mountains, Ralph Storer, 
 The High Mountains of Britain and Ireland, Irvine Butterfield, 
 Hamish’s Mountain Walk, Hamish Brown, 
 The Munros, Scotland's Highest Mountains, Cameron McNeish, 
 The Magic Of The Munros, Irvine Butterfield, 

Footnotes

Munros
Marilyns of Scotland
Mountains and hills of the Central Highlands
Mountains and hills of Highland (council area)
One-thousanders of Scotland
Lochaber